Aashachakram is a 1973 Indian Malayalam-language film, directed by Dr. Seetharamaswamy. The film stars Sathyan, Thikkurissy Sukumaran Nair, Sankaradi and Raghavan. The film had musical score by B. A. Chidambaranath.

Cast
Sathyan as Ravichandran
Thikkurissy Sukumaran Nair as Rajasekharan
Sankaradi as Ramu 
Raghav as Gopalan
Poosala as N Maran/Kumar Chandran
Ushakumari as Hema 
P. R. Menon as Manager
Sreelatha Namboothiri as Seetha, Kusumam (double role)

Soundtrack
The music was composed by B. A. Chidambaranath and the lyrics were written by P. Bhaskaran, Kedamangalam Sadanandan and M. K. R. Paattyath.

References

External links
 

1973 films
1970s Malayalam-language films